Free Church College may refer to: 
 One of the three original ministerial training institutions of the Free Church of Scotland (1843–1900):
 Free Church College, Aberdeen, now Christ's College, Aberdeen
 Free Church College, Edinburgh, now New College, Edinburgh
 Free Church College, Glasgow, now Trinity College, Glasgow
 Edinburgh Theological Seminary, which was run by the Free Church of Scotland (since 1900) after the United Free Church was granted the buildings of New College.
 Free Church Training College in Glasgow, which trained teachers
 Free Church College, Halifax, now part of the Atlantic School of Theology